Josaia Naulumatua "Joe" Lovodua (born 18 March 1998) is a Fijian professional rugby league footballer who plays for Hull F.C. in the Super League. He has represented the Fijian national team, most notably at the 2017 Rugby League World Cup.

Early life
Lovodua was born in Lautoka, Fiji.

He played junior rugby league for Hurstville United.

Playing career
Lovodua began playing for the St. George Illawarra Dragons in the 2017 Holden Cup. In 2018 and 2019 he played in the Canterbury Cup NSW for the Dragons.

He was selected to represent  in the 2017 Rugby League World Cup.

In 2021, he joined South Sydney's NSW Cup team.

Lovodua joined Hull F.C. on a one-year contract for 2022.

References

External links
Dragons profile
2017 RLWC profile

1998 births
Living people
Combined Nationalities rugby league team players
Fijian rugby league players
Fiji national rugby league team players
Hull F.C. players
Rugby league hookers
Rugby league locks
Rugby league second-rows